Madeline Nicole Washington (born August 1, 1988) is an American retired professional soccer forward and right midfielder who last played for Boston Breakers in the National Women's Soccer League (NWSL) and is currently an assistant coach for the women's soccer team at the University of Washington.  She previously played for Chicago Red Stars, Boston Breakers, and magicJack in Women's Professional Soccer as well as the Portland Thorns FC and Houston Dash in the NWSL. She captained the United States team that won the 2008 FIFA U-20 Women's World Cup and played for the under-23 team.

Early life
Born in Mesquite, Texas to parents, Freida and Lecolion Washington, Washington was named after her grandmother. She has two brothers and one sister.

Washington spent her first freshman and sophomore years in high school at Greenhill School in Addison, Texas before transferring to Spring Creek Academy. She was named the 2003 Dallas Area Freshman of the Year and made the All-Conference team in both 2003 and 2004. Following her high school graduation a year early in 2005, she was also named a Parade All-American.

As a youth, Washington played for the Dallas Texans, captaining the '88 Texans team to the 2006 USYSA National Championship and was named an NSCAA Youth All-American in 2003, 2004 and 2005.

University of North Carolina at Chapel Hill
Washington subsequently joined the University of North Carolina at Chapel Hill in 2006. In her first season with the Tar Heels she equaled an NCAA record for a freshman by starting all 28 matches of the season, a feat which also saw her named to the Freshman All-American team. She finished her collegiate career having scored 17 goals and with 28 assists.

In preparation for her senior year at North Carolina, Washington played for Pali Blues, scoring six goals and providing two assists. Blues head coach Charlie Naimo said of her, "Nikki brings a lot of experience at a young age. She has competed in club national championships with the Dallas Texans, won two NCAA titles at UNC and most recently captained the U.S. U20 Women's National Team to a gold medal at the FIFA U20 World Cup in Chile this past fall."

Playing career

Clubs

WPS, 2010–2011 
On January 15, 2010, Washington was drafted 5th overall to the Los Angeles Sol in the 2010 WPS Draft despite playing only eight games during the prior collegiate season due to an anterior cruciate ligament injury. However, less than two weeks later on January 27, it was announced that the team, runner's up in the league the previous season but which had been under the administration of the Women's Professional Soccer league, were unable to find a new owner and would close. In a disposal draft of Sol players held on February 4, 2010, Washington was drafted sixth overall by Sky Blue FC. After a contractual agreement could not be made between Washington and Sky Blue, she was traded to the Saint Louis Athletica in May 2010.  Just a month later, she was traded to the Chicago Red Stars after the dissolution of Saint Louis Athletica.

Prior to the start of the 2011 season, Washington was traded to the Boston Breakers.  She made five appearances for the club. In June 2011, she was traded to magicJack.

Pali Blues and Canberra United, 2012 
Following the folding of the WPS, Washington re-signed for Pali Blues in the W-League for the summer of 2012. She made 11 appearances for the club and helped the team finish undefeated and in first place during the regular season. The club won the Western Conference championship after defeating the Sounders Women 1–0 on July 22 in Fullerton, California. After advancing to the W-League Final Four in Ottawa, the Blues were defeated in the final by the Ottawa Fury. Washington scored the game-opening goal in the second minute of them match.

Washington joined Australian W-League team Canberra United FC later the same year. In her five appearances for the club, she scored three goals in five games. During a match against Perth Glory on December 5, she helped Canberra win with the game-winning goal in the 53rd minute.

NWSL, 2013–15 

In February 2013, it was announced that Washington had signed with the Portland Thorns for the inaugural season of the National Women's Soccer League.
She made 11 appearances for the Thorns during the 2013 season, scoring one goal and serving two assists. After finishing third during the regular season and advancing to the playoffs, Portland captured the inaugural National Women's Soccer League championship title on August 21 after defeating regular season champions Western New York Flash 2–0 in Rochester, New York.

In January 2014, Washington was traded to expansion team Houston Dash during the 2014 NWSL College Draft. Dash head coach Randy Waldrum said, "With the trade, we were able to acquire Nikki Washington, a Texas native, who has played in both the WPS and NWSL. She too has blazing speed, and can play in multiple positions. She's an attacking force that can wreak havoc with defenses." She made three appearances for the Dash before being traded to the Boston Breakers. Washington played 15 matches and scored one goal during the 2014 season.

Washington announced her retirement from professional soccer in February 2015 ahead of the start of the 2015 season. Breakers general manager Lee Billiard said of her retirement, "We would like to thank Nikki for her contributions to the Boston Breakers and for her work within women's soccer. Nikki is a fantastic professional and someone who we will miss in Boston."

International
Washington captained the United States team that won the 2008 FIFA U-20 Women's World Cup and played 65 minutes during the final against North Korea. 
She was a member of the U23 National Team in 2009.

Coaching and administration career
Washington co-founded a girls' soccer camp with Casey Nogueira called Camp Foot Ballas. In the summer of 2015, she joined Texas Christian University women's soccer team as the Director of Operations. She is also coach of the Dallas Texans Soccer Club. She briefly coached an 05 girls Texans team before moving to Washington.

Washington joined the University of Washington's women's soccer team as an assistant coach in 2017. In October 2020 it was announced that she had joined the NWSL's Utah Royals as an assistant coach, the second Black female coach in the NWSL.

See also

 2008 FIFA U-20 Women's World Cup squads
 List of foreign W-League (Australia) players
 List of University of North Carolina at Chapel Hill alumni

References

Further reading
 Ashu, Saxena (2012), Soccer: Strategies for Sustained Coaching Success, Meyer & Meyer Verla, 
 Crothers, Tim (2010), The Man Watching: Anson Dorrance and the University of North Carolina Women's Soccer Dynasty, Macmillan, 
 Grainey, Timothy (2012), Beyond Bend It Like Beckham: The Global Phenomenon of Women's Soccer, University of Nebraska Press, 
 Stevens, Dakota (2011), A Look at the Women's Professional Soccer Including the Soccer Associations, Teams, Players, Awards, and More, BiblioBazaar,

External links

 Boston Breakers player profile
 Portland Thorns player profile
 Houston Dash player profile (archived)
 North Carolina player profile
 

1988 births
Living people
American women's soccer players
Los Angeles Sol players
Chicago Red Stars players
Saint Louis Athletica players
Boston Breakers players
MagicJack (WPS) players
North Carolina Tar Heels women's soccer players
Soccer players from Texas
People from Mesquite, Texas
Pali Blues players
Portland Thorns FC players
Footballers at the 2007 Pan American Games
Sportspeople from the Dallas–Fort Worth metroplex
Houston Dash players
Women's association football midfielders
Women's association football forwards
Pan American Games silver medalists for the United States
National Women's Soccer League players
United States women's under-20 international soccer players
Pan American Games medalists in football
African-American women's soccer players
Medalists at the 2007 Pan American Games
21st-century African-American sportspeople
21st-century African-American women
20th-century African-American people
20th-century African-American women
Women's Professional Soccer players